Hyacinth or Hyacinthus may refer to:

Nature

Plants
 Hyacinth (plant), genus Hyacinthus
 Hyacinthus orientalis, common hyacinth
 Grape hyacinth, Muscari, a genus of perennial bulbous plants native to Eurasia
 Hyacinth bean, Lablab, a genus of bean in the family Fabaceae with the sole species Lablab purpureus
 Water hyacinth, Pontederia crassipes, aquatic plant native to the Amazon basin

Animals
 Hyacinth macaw, a species of parrot
 Hyacinth, a breed of pigeon

People
 Flora Hyacinth (born 1966), retired female track and field athlete
 Hyacinth (given name), list of people with this name

 Hyacinth (mythology), divine hero in Greek mythology
 Hyacinthus the Lacedaemonian (in Greek mythology), who sacrificed his daughters to Athena or Persephone
 Hyacinth of Caesarea (died 108), early Christian martyr saint
 Hyacinth and Protus (martyred 257–9), Christian saints
 Hyacinth of Poland (1185–1257), Polish priest, canonized 1594
 Hyacinth (Bichurin) (1777–1853), one of the founding fathers of Sinology

Arts and entertainment
 "Hyacinth", a 2004 song by Aya Matsuura
 "Hyacinth", a 2021 song by Serpentwithfeet from Deacon
 Hyacinth Bucket, a character in Keeping Up Appearances
 Hyacinth Bridgerton, a character in Bridgerton

Mineral
 Hyacinth, alternative name for yellow zircon, the mineral
 Hyacinth, a gemstone sometimes called jacinth

Vessels
 HMS Hyacinth
 USS Hyacinth

Other uses
 Hyacinth, Virginia
 Confection of hyacinth, ancient medical treatment (that used zircon)

See also
 St. Hyacinth (disambiguation)
 San Jacinto (disambiguation) ("Saint Hyacinth" in Spanish)
 Hurricane Hyacinth
 Operation Hyacinth
 Hyacinthe (disambiguation)